The 1981 Denver Broncos season was the team's 22nd year in professional football and its 12th with the National Football League (NFL). Led by first-year head coach Dan Reeves,  the Broncos were 10–6, tied for first in the AFC West, but failed to make the postseason again due to their loss to the Buffalo Bills, who gained the final berth.

The Broncos were undefeated at home in 1981, but had six road losses. After a promising 8–3 start, Denver lost three of their final five games, including a critical loss at Cincinnati in week 12. Entering the season finale at Chicago, they had a one-game lead over the San Diego Chargers in the AFC West, but the loss at Soldier Field ended their season, losing the tiebreakers for the division and wild card berths.

Prior to this season, ownership changed in February; coaching and front office changes were made in March.

NFL Draft

Personnel

Staff

Roster

Regular season

Schedule

Standings

References

External links
Denver Broncos – 1981 media guide
1981 Denver Broncos at Pro-Football-Reference.com

Denver Broncos
Denver Broncos seasons
Denver Bronco